Hazlet may refer to:

 Hazlet, New Jersey, United States
 Hazlet, Saskatchewan, Canada
 Hazlet (NJT station), one of 20 New Jersey Transit commuter rail stations on the North Jersey Coast Line

See also

 Haslet (disambiguation)
 Haslett
 Hazlitt (disambiguation)